A constitutional referendum was held in American Samoa on 2 November 1976. 
The amendment proposed introducing a new section 25 to Chapter II, article 25 of the constitution, which would have read:

The proposal was approved by voters in the referendum, and subsequently by the American Department of the Interior on 8 April 1977.

References

1976 in American Samoa
1976 referendums
Constitutional referendums in American Samoa